David Charles Hopkins (born 11 February 1957) is a former English cricketer. Hopkins was a right-handed batsman who bowled right-arm medium pace. He was born in Birmingham, Warwickshire.

Hopkins made his first-class debut for Warwickshire against Somerset in the 1977 County Championship. He made 35 further first-class appearances, the last of which came against Yorkshire in the 1981 County Championship. In his 36 first-class matches, he scored 332 runs at an average of 10.37, with a high score of 34 not out. With the ball, he took 53 wickets at a bowling average of 38.13, with best figures of 6/67. These figures, his only five wicket haul in first-class cricket, came against Somerset in the 1979 County Championship, a season in which he took 27 wickets at an average of 32.81, which was his most successful season in first-class cricket. He made his List A debut for Warwickshire against Leicestershire in the 1978 John Player League. He made 23 further List A appearances, the last of which came against Devon in the 1980 Gillette Cup. In his 24 List A appearances, he scored 60 runs at an average of 7.50, with a high score of 35 not out. With the ball, he took 22 wickets at an average of 32.36, with best figures of 3/26.

Leaving Warwickshire at the end of the 1981 season he joined Buckinghamshire, making 2 appearances for the county in the 1982 Minor Counties Championship, both against Oxfordshire.

References

External links
David Hopkins at ESPNcricinfo

1957 births
Living people
Cricketers from Birmingham, West Midlands
English cricketers
Warwickshire cricketers
Buckinghamshire cricketers
English cricketers of 1969 to 2000